The Magritte Award for Best Foreign Film in Coproduction (French: Magritte du meilleur film étranger en coproduction) is an award presented annually by the Académie André Delvaux. It is one of the Magritte Awards, which were established to recognize excellence in Belgian cinematic achievements.

It was first awarded in 2012, when Best Film in Coproduction was split in Best Foreign Film in Coproduction and Best Flemish Film in Coproduction. As of the 2022 ceremony, Titane is the most recent winner in this category.

Winners and nominees
In the list below, winners are listed first in the colored row, followed by the other nominees.

2010s

2020s

References

External links
 Magritte Awards official website
 Magritte Award for Best Foreign Film in Coproduction at AlloCiné

2012 establishments in Belgium
Awards established in 2012
Awards for best film
Lists of films by award
Foreign Film in Coproduction